Rado ide Srbin u vojnike, translated as "The Serb Enlists Gladly in the Army", is a popular Serbian patriotic song. Its music composition by Kornelije Stanković was adopted alongside Sunce jarko into Tchaikovsky's Marche Slave.

See also
List of Serbian folk songs

References

Serbian patriotic songs
Military marches
Serbia in World War I
Year of song missing
Cultural depictions of Serbian men